Norbornane (also known as bicyclo[2.2.1]heptane) is an organic compound and a saturated hydrocarbon with chemical formula C7H12. It is a crystalline compound with a melting point of 88 °C. The carbon skeleton is derived from cyclohexane ring with a methylene bridge in the 1,4- position, and is a bridged bicyclic compound. The compound is a prototype of a class of strained bicyclic hydrocarbons.

The compound was originally synthesized by reduction of norcamphor.

The name norbornane is derived from bornane, which is 1,7,7-trimethylnorbornane, being a derivative of camphor (bornanone).  The prefix nor refers to the stripping of the methyl groups from the parent molecule bornane.

See also
 2-Norbornyl cation
 Norbornene
 Norbornadiene
 Bornane
 endo-Norborneol
 exo-Norborneol
 Norcamphor, the ketone derivative of norbornane

References

External links
 Norbornane in 3D
 Datasheet at Sigma-Aldrich

Bicycloalkanes